Gordon Andrew Lindsay (1 May 1911 – 11 November 1967) was an Australian rules footballer who played for Melbourne in the Victorian Football League (VFL).

Family
The son of Andrew Lindsay (1884–1954), and Margaret Mary Lindsay (1889–1912), née McEwan, Gordon Andrew Lindsay was born at Ringwood, Victoria on 1 May 1911.

He married Kathleen Veronica Barron (1914–) in 1938.

Death
He died at Box Hill Hospital on 11 November 1967.

Notes

References
 
 'Forward', "Football: Practice Matches: South Melbourne's Bright Prospects", The Age, (Monday, 6 April 1931), p.3.
 Football: League Permits Granted, The Age, (Thursday, 30 April 1931), p.4.
 Ringwood District Association, The Age, (Thursday, 1 June 1933), p.5.
 'Qui Vive', "Most Sides Are Stronger and a More Even Season Anticipated: Weight and Pace", The Sporting Globe, (Wednesday, 25 April 1934), p.9.
 Association Resumes: Clearances and New Players, The Argus, (Wednesday, 20 June 1934), p.9.

External links 
 
 
 Gordon Lindsay at Demonwiki.
 Gordon Lindsay at The VFA Project.

1911 births
Australian rules footballers from Melbourne
Melbourne Football Club players
1967 deaths
People from Ringwood, Victoria